Joséphine Japy (born 12 July 1994) is a French actress. She made her debut in the 2005 film , directed by Yves Angelo. In 2014, she played the lead role of Charlie in the film Respire, which was presented in the International Critics' Week at the Cannes Film Festival. 

She has a master's degree in Sociology from Sciences Po Lyon, a grande école in France.

Filmography

References

External links

 

1994 births
Living people
French film actresses
21st-century French actresses
Actresses from Paris